The following are the winners of the 33rd annual Origins Award, held in 2007:

References

2006 awards
 
2006 awards in the United States